Hornstedtia havilandii, also known as panyun (in Iban) or telidus (in Sabah), is a species of flowering plant, a perennial tropical forest herb in the ginger family, that is endemic to Borneo.

Description
The species grows as a clump of leafy shoots forming pseudostems to 3–4 m in height from branching rhizomes. The inflorescence, 20–40 cm tall, rises directly from the rhizome. The flowers are red with white lips. The rectangular, edible fruits, 3 x 1.5 cm, ripen cream to yellow, containing many small black seeds in a translucent whitish aril.

Distribution and habitat
The species is found in the lowland and mixed dipterocarp forest, as well as riparian forest, at elevations of up to 1,000 m.

Usage
The species is rarely cultivated. The fruits have a passionfruit flavour and are eaten raw. The shoots may be cooked and eaten as a vegetable.

References

 
havilandii
Endemic flora of Borneo
Fruits originating in Asia
Plants described in 1904
Taxa named by Karl Moritz Schumann